Ray Vandeveer (born July 8, 1953) is a Minnesota politician and former member of the Minnesota Senate representing District 52, which included portions of Anoka and Washington counties in the northeastern Twin Cities metropolitan area.  A Republican, he was first elected to the Senate in 2006, and was reelected in 2010.

Before being elected to the Senate, Vandeveer was a member of the Minnesota House of Representatives, representing District 52A and, before the 2002 redistricting, the old District 51B. He was first elected to the House in a January 1998 special election after Representative Doug Swenson was appointed a district judge by Governor Arne Carlson. He was reelected that November and again in 2000, 2002 and 2004. He chaired the House Taxes Subcommittee for the Property and Local Tax Division during the 2005-06 legislative session.

Vandeveer was chair of the Senate Local Government and Elections Committee, and was also a member of the Senate Commerce and Consumer Protection and the Senate Energy, Utilities and Telecommunications committees. His special legislative concerns included taxes, education, transportation, and crime prevention.

Vandeveer is a real estate appraiser by profession. He graduated from Columbia Heights High School in Columbia Heights, then went on to St. Cloud State University in St. Cloud, where he earned a B.S. in marketing in 1975. He is a former member of the Forest Lake Planning Commission and of the Mounds View Charter Commission. He is a member of the Greater Minneapolis Area Board of Realtors.

References

External links

Senator Vandeveer Web Page
Minnesota Public Radio Votetracker: Senator Ray Vandeveer
Project Vote Smart - Senator Ray Vandeveer Profile

1953 births
Living people
Republican Party Minnesota state senators
People from Forest Lake, Minnesota
21st-century American politicians